Adam John Grandmaison (born November 24, 1983), more commonly known as Adam22, is an American podcaster and YouTuber. He is best known for being the creator and host of pop culture-oriented podcast No Jumper.

Early life 
Grandmaison became a BMX rider at a young age and enjoyed hip-hop music, including Gucci Mane's hit "Bricks" that includes the line, "I'm ballin' like an athlete but got no Jumper." This inspired the name No Jumper for his future blog. Grandmaison has mentioned this on his podcast and in interviews many times.

Former U.S. President Bill Clinton was close friends with Grandmaison's father, Philip J. Grandmaison, whose brother was one of Clinton's earliest supporters in 1992. In December 2000, Clinton pardoned Grandmaison's father after formerly being convicted of voter mail fraud in 1996.

Career

2006–2011: The Come Up and ONSOMESHIT 
In 2006, Grandmaison started the BMX website The Come Up. Later, he created ONSOMESHIT, a BMX biking team and BMX-based clothing line which at one point had a retail store on Melrose Avenue in Los Angeles.

2011–present: No Jumper 
No Jumper was originally a blog on Tumblr created in 2011 by Grandmaison, where other hip-hop oriented article writers were paid by Grandmaison to write about music. The blog showed early interest in underground artists such as SpaceGhostPurrp and Clams Casino, and reviewed obscure Gucci Mane mixtapes, treating the underground with "critical attention".

Revived in 2015, Grandmaison's No Jumper podcast, hosted on YouTube, focuses on interviews with rap artists and pop culture tastemakers. As of January 2022, the channel had reached over 1.1 billion video views. It originally started as a BMX podcast with vlogs dedicated to Grandmaison's life running ONSOMESHIT's retail store. His interview of Memphis underground rapper Xavier Wulf soon turned viral within hip-hop communities, sparking Grandmaison's newfound interest in interviewing known figures within both underground and mainstream hip-hop.

Grandmaison, through his No Jumper podcast, has been noted for interviewing up-and-coming talent as well as established rappers. He has interviewed artists including Lil Yachty, Lil Peep, Pouya, Juice WRLD, Suicideboys, Young Thug, Tekashi69 and most famously XXXTentacion in April 2016; the latter interview received over 13 million views. This was the Florida rapper's first official professional interview, and has been credited with giving him exposure to a wide audience.

In addition to underground and established rappers, Grandmaison through his No Jumper channel has expanded to interview a variety of artists and pop culture-oriented guests, of different careers and backgrounds including livestreamers, music executives, actors, YouTubers, music critics, and fashion designers. Notable people interviewed include Anthony Fantano, KSI, Riley Reid, "Sugar" Sean O'Malley, Aaron Carter, and Charlamagne tha God.

Hot 97 DJ Peter Rosenberg has said he views Grandmaison "as an advance scout searching for combustible new talent", while Rolling Stone described him as "underground hip-hop's major tastemaker".

The No Jumper YouTube channel had over 4.1 million subscribers as of February 2022. Jon Caramanica of the New York Times described No Jumper as "The Paris Review for the face-tattoo set".

Grandmaison hosted the inaugural Trap Circus music festival in Miami, Florida, in 2017.

On June 20, 2018, Grandmaison held a memorial event for rapper XXXTentacion, who had been killed in Florida two days prior, in front of his ONSOMESHIT store in Los Angeles, with a crowd of about 300 people. The crowd soon grew to over 1,000, and police in riot gear eventually appeared in response. According to reports, rubber bullets were shot and tear gas was used to disperse the crowd.

Grandmaison was one of the promoters for YouTube personality FouseyTube's event "Hate Dies, Love Arrives", which was shut down via a bomb threat which left 1,500 people evacuated. Shortly after the event, while Grandmaison interviewed Shane Dawson, mid-interview, FouseyTube, Keemstar and numerous other YouTube personalities interrupted, causing the interview to go viral.

During the 2022 trial of rapper Tory Lanez for his 2020 shooting of Megan Thee Stallion, No Jumper's news coverage of the event was stated to have promoted “an overeagerness to share unverified information”. On December 22, 2022, the podcast's Twitter account falsely claimed that Lanez had been found not guilty on all charges. The following day, Lanez was convicted by the jury on three felony charges in respect to the shooting: assault with a semiautomatic handgun, having a loaded and unregistered firearm in a vehicle, and gross negligence in discharging his firearm.

2017–present: Pornography 
Grandmaison began debuting in personalized adult films alongside his partner Lena Nersesian (known professionally as "Lena the Plug") for the website OnlyFans in 2017; uploading a 2-minute and 16-second video to YouTube announcing a sex tape starring the two of them, to be released once his girlfriend was to reach 1 million subscribers.

In December 2019, the film was announced to be a professional adult film and was released for free in collaboration with Pornhub titled "Podcast Smash". The title is a reference to Adam22's No Jumper podcast and stars him and his partner Lena the Plug.

Grandmaison, along with his fiancé Lena, announced a new podcast in November 2021 entitled Plug Talk, which focuses on interviewing adult film stars on OnlyFans and having intercourse with them afterward. It premiered November 16, 2021, with guest Adriana Chechik.

Personal life 
Grandmaison is engaged to vlogger, internet personality and adult film actress Lena Nersesian (Lena the Plug). On Valentine's Day of 2020, the two announced that they were expecting their first child together. Their daughter was born on November 14.

Grandmaison identifies as an atheist.

In 2018, Grandmaison was accused of sexual and physical assault by two women. Though he denied these accusations, Atlantic Records eventually severed its relationship with him.

Discography

Singles

References

External links 
 No Jumper Official Site
 ONSOMESHIT Official Site
 The Come Up Official Site

1983 births
Living people
People from Nashua, New Hampshire
21st-century American businesspeople
Businesspeople from Los Angeles
YouTube podcasters
American podcasters
Twitch (service) streamers
American pornographic film actors
YouTubers from New Hampshire
Music YouTubers
YouTube controversies